The 1970 Asunción Israeli Embassy shooting was a terrorist attack on May 4, 1970, that took place at the Israeli embassy building in Asunción, Paraguay. Two embassy secretaries were shot by two Palestinian men rumored to have belonged to Fatah. It was the first attack against an Israeli embassy.

Attack 
On the morning of May 4, 1970, at approximately 10:30 a.m., two young Arab men approached the reception of the Israeli Embassy, asking to see the Israeli ambassador to Paraguay, Benjamin Varon. Embassy secretaries Diana Zawluk and Edna Peer tended to the pair and informed them that the ambassador was not present at the time. The two men then left. An hour later, at around 11:30 a.m., they returned to the embassy and opened fire at the two women who had spoken to them earlier. Peer died later at a hospital and Zahluk was critically injured. The perpetrators fled before being apprehended by police shortly after.

Perpetrators 
In subsequent investigations by the National Police, it was revealed that both attackers were of Palestinian origin and were reported to be members of the Fatah organization - an organization that had begun its armed struggle against Israel in the 1960's. They were identified as Miguel Adapo and Cando Kalek. A third suspected accomplice was sought by police.

References 

Terrorist attacks attributed to Palestinian militant groups
Attacks on buildings and structures in 1970
Terrorism in Paraguay
Attacks on buildings and structures in Paraguay
1970s in Asunción
May 1970 events in South America
Attacks on diplomatic missions of Israel
Terrorist incidents in South America in 1970
Events in Asunción